Jesse Huta Galung was the defending champion, but lost against eventual finalist Leonardo Mayer in the first round.

3rd seed Steve Darcis won the title, defeating Mayer 4–6, 6–3, 6–2 in the final.

Seeds

  Rui Machado (semifinals)
  Frederico Gil (first round)
  Steve Darcis (champion)
  Jesse Huta Galung (first round)
  Ivo Minář (first round)
  Nikola Ćirić (second round)
  Matteo Viola (second round)
  David Guez (first round)

Draw

Final four

Top half

Bottom half

References
 Main Draw
 Qualifying Draw

Trani Cup - Singles
Trani Cup